Elsholtzia ciliata, commonly known as Vietnamese balm, xiang ru (香薷) or kinh giới in Vietnamese, is a plant native to Asia. In the US, it is commonly known as Crested Late Summer Mint. In US Vietnamese grocery stores, it is called Kinh Gioi, Vietnamese Lemon Balm, or Vietnamese Lemon Mint.

Distribution and habitat

The plant is native to Asia. However, the exact extent of its original range is unclear.  

It is introduced in India and parts of North American and Europe. Some of its habitats include riverbanks, forests, and hills.

Description
The leaves are simple and opposite with serrated margins.

Uses
Elsholtzia ciliata has many cultural uses.

Culinary
It is used in Vietnamese cuisine, where it is called rau kinh giới or lá kinh giới. The leaves are used to flavor meat dishes, soups, and salads with a lemony flavor.

Traditional medicine

It is commonly used in herbal medicine, as it is considered to be carminative and astringent.

Cultivation
It is cultivated as an ornamental plant. It prefers moist soil, and grows mostly on exposed rocky slopes and other open, gravelly areas.

It is banned in the state of Connecticut and is classified as a noxious weed. It was first reported in the Americas in 1889.

Gallery

References

Bibliography

External links
 

Lamiaceae
Flora of temperate Asia
Flora of the Indian subcontinent
Flora of Indo-China
Garden plants of Asia
Medicinal plants of Asia
Plants described in 1784